The Liberian National Coast Guard is the naval force of Liberia, part of the Armed Forces of Liberia. Its main duties are law enforcement along Liberia's coast and in its maritime area, and aiding those in distress.

History
The Liberian National Coast Guard, was established in 1959. Throughout the Tubman period the coastguard was little more than a few sometimes unserviceable patrol craft manned by ill-trained personnel, though its training improved in the 1980s to the point where it was considered the best trained of the armed services.

In 1984 the Liberian National Coast Guard contained about 450 personnel. Under Samuel Doe the Coast Guard was retitled the Liberian Navy in 1986 through the passage of The Liberian Navy Act of 1986. However, as a result of the First and Second Liberian civil wars, the navy lost control of its bases and was reduced to an insignificant force.

The Coast Guard was reactivated on the 53rd Armed Forces Day on February 11, 2010, with an initial strength of 40 personnel who had been trained in the United States. A United States Coast Guard officer is now serving at the U.S. Embassy in Monrovia supporting efforts to reestablish the Liberian Coast Guard.

A detachment from SeaBee Naval Mobile Construction Battalion 7, based at Naval Station Rota, Spain, constructed a United States Africa Command-funded boat ramp and concrete perimeter wall for the Coast Guard, which was handed over in December 2010. In February 2011, the United States turned over two donated USCG Defender class boats to the Coast Guard.

Fleet
The fleet of the Liberian National Coast Guard currently consists of:
 2x 27' Defenders (SAFE 27 Full Cabin)
 2x 33' Law Enforcement (SPC-LE) - based on Defender-class (SAFE 33 Full Cabin)
 2x 24' Boston Whalers

Ranks

The ranks and insignia of the Liberian National Coast Guard are based on those of the United States Coast Guard, and are laid out in the Liberian Defense Act of 2008.

Officers
<noinclude>

Enlisted personnel
<noinclude>

References

Government of Liberia
Military of Liberia
1950s establishments in Liberia